Dyckia pulquinensis is a plant species in the genus Dyckia. This species is endemic to Bolivia.

References

pulquinensis
Endemic flora of Bolivia